A Bridge Too Far may refer to:

 "A bridge too far", an idiom inspired by Operation Market Garden, meaning an act of overreaching
 A Bridge Too Far (book), a non-fiction book by Cornelius Ryan on Operation Market Garden
 A Bridge Too Far (film), a film based on the book, directed by Richard Attenborough
 Close Combat: A Bridge Too Far, a video game based on Operation Market Garden
 A Bridge Too Far, a Historical Advanced Squad Leader module for the board game Advanced Squad Leader based on Operation Market Garden